Zafar Ali Naqvi (born 24 April 1948) is an Indian politician and former Member of parliament, Lok Sabha, from Lakhimpur Kheri constituency. His political party is the Indian National Congress. He was also cabinet minister for Home and Environment in U.P. Government.

Biography

Early life

Zafar is a member of the Naqvi family, one of the richest and most prominent families in Lakhimpur.

Education and early career
Zafar Ali Naqvi has done his schooling from Sitapur and attended the University of Lucknow and holds the degrees Bachelor of Arts(B.A.) and Bachelor of Laws (LL.B).

Previously he has represented Lakhimpur Assembly Constituency, twice, in 1980 and 1989.

Political career
Zafar Ali Naqvi is the Chairman of Standing Committee of National Monitoring Committee for Minorities Education. He has previously held the responsibilities of Chairman of Minorities Commission, Delhi.

Zafar is a former Home Minister of Uttar Pradesh.

In the 2009 Parliamentary Elections, he has closely defeated Iliyas Azmi of Bahujan Samaj Party, with a margin of 8,780 securing a total of  votes.

He was a prominent figure in a high-profile Congress campaign in Uttar Pradesh for the Indian general election, 2009. Congress won 21 seats in Uttar Pradesh mainly because of the efforts of Rahul Gandhi and Priyanka Gandhi in the state. The election saw the Indian National Congress  become the majority stake holder in Parliament.

Senior Congress leaders such as Sonia Gandhi, Digvijay Singh have raised calls for Zafar Ali Naqvi to be the candidate in 2009 elections.

His supporters claim that Zafar's promise of getting the Meter gauge railway track of the district converted to Broad gauge was delivered in mere 22 months of his becoming the MP. But the fact remains that the conversion of the gauge started after Narendra Modi became the PM and started the conversion of the gauge everywhere in India. The work is still not complete as of March 2019.

Personal life
Zafar's spouse, Shahnaz Naqvi is from Kanpur. He has two sons- elder son Monis is a pilot and younger son Saif Ali Naqvi is a politician of INC. He has been the life member of International Film And Television Club of Asian Academy of Film & Television.

See also
 Indian National Congress
 Lakhimpur Kheri district
 University of Lucknow

References
 Member of Parliament
 2009 LokSabha Candidates' Affidavit Data
 Amar Ujala - Today is Zafar Naqvi's day
 Nerdz 2003, Jamia Hamdard, New Delhi
 Lakhimpur, General Elections 2009
 Updated Election Results Details of Kheri
 Congress will keep both BSP and SP away
 Inshallah! Muslim quota in IITs, IIMs-India-The Times of India
 Minorities complain against police-Delhi-Cities-The Times of India
 Congress fields Dasai Choudhary against LJP chief Ramvilas Paswan-The Times of India

External links
 https://www.youtube.com/watch?v=fLQzPhT7BjY
 UP-Muslim-MPs-prefer-settlement

Living people
Indian National Congress politicians
People from Lakhimpur Kheri
India MPs 2009–2014
Indian Shia Muslims
University of Lucknow alumni
1948 births
Institute of Management Technology, Ghaziabad alumni
Lok Sabha members from Uttar Pradesh
United Progressive Alliance candidates in the 2014 Indian general election